Mpanjaka is a genus of moths in the subfamily Lymantriinae. The genus was erected by Paul Griveaud in 1976.

Species
Some of the species are:

See also
 List of moths of Madagascar

References

Lymantriinae